Sheikhpura Assembly constituency is one of 243 constituencies of legislative assembly of Bihar. It is part of  Jamui Lok Sabha constituency.

Overview
Sheikhpura comprises CD Blocks Ghatkusumbha, Chewara and Ariari; Gram Panchayats Mahsar, Puraina, Pachna, Jamuara, Kaithawan, Gagari and Sheikhpura (M) of Sheikhpura CD Block.

Members of Legislative Assembly

Election results

2020

2015

References

External links
 

Politics of Sheikhpura district
Assembly constituencies of Bihar